Final league standings for the 1908-09 St. Louis Soccer League.

League standings

References
St. Louis Soccer Leagues (RSSSF)
The Year in American Soccer - 1909

1908-09
1908–09 domestic association football leagues
1908–09 in American soccer
St Louis Soccer
St Louis Soccer